Rodrigo Antonio Lombardo Tosi (born 6 January 1983) is a Brazilian footballer. Across his career he has played in Brazil, Malaysia, Greece, Switzerland, Iran, Singapore, Indonesia, Republic of Ireland and Brunei.

Career

He joined Tampines Rovers on the S.League transfer deadline day in time for the 2015 S.League season. He terminated his contract with Brazilian Serie B side, Paraná Clube to join the Stags. He replaces Haitian forward Fabrice Noël who left the club on personal reasons. Tosi made his Tampines debut in a televised match against Geylang International in the Eastern Derby.

Tosi joined Irish club Limerick on 21 January 2017. He made an immediate impact, scoring a hat trick on his debut against Sligo Rovers and continued to score goals throughout the season, including a number of crucial winning goals late in the season as Limerick avoided a relegation battle.

Tosi joined Indera SC in 2020. During the 2020 AFC Cup, he scored the only Indera SC's goal against Yangon United FC which ended in a defeat of 1-6.

Honours

Team
Lausanne Sport
 Swiss Challenge League: 2009-10

Esteghlal
Iran Pro League: 2012-13

DPMM FC
Singapore League Cup: 2014

Individual
2014 S.League top scorer: 24 goals

Club career statistics

References

External links
Career history at ASF

1983 births
Living people
Brazilian footballers
Brazilian expatriate footballers
Paraná Clube players
J. Malucelli Futebol players
Joinville Esporte Clube players
Iraklis Thessaloniki F.C. players
Expatriate footballers in Switzerland
Neuchâtel Xamax FCS players
Expatriate footballers in Brunei
FC Lausanne-Sport players
Expatriate footballers in Iran
Esteghlal F.C. players
Tractor S.C. players
DPMM FC players
Indera SC players
Singapore Premier League players
League of Ireland players
Limerick F.C. players
Association football forwards
Footballers from Curitiba
Brazilian expatriate sportspeople in Brunei